Gary McCausland (born 10 June 1968 in Belfast, Northern Ireland), is a Chartered Property Surveyor, property developer/investor, author and former television presenter. He is the CEO of The Richland Group, a property development company based in Berkeley Square, London, UK. Previously he presented Channel 5's "How To Be A Property Developer" between 2004 and 2008, and Property Developing Abroad for Granada Media.

Early life
The eldest of seven (two girls, five boys), McCausland grew up in Dungannon throughout The Troubles in the 1970s and 80s. He obtained a BSc (Hons) Upper Class Second in Estate Management and a Post Graduate Diploma in Accountancy with commendation from the University of Ulster. He qualified as a Chartered Property Surveyor (RICS) in 1995.  McCausland presently sits as a Director on the Foundation Board of the University of Ulster.

Career
On graduation he worked as a Management Accountant (CIMA) from 1992, and then moved to a senior management role at Cable & Wireless from 1993 to 1998, where he worked as a Property Manager. After this, he moved to London and joined MCI, becoming their Estate's Director from 1998 to 2000. McCausland then worked for the Carlyle Group as their European Property Sales Director until 2001.

McCausland spent around ten years buying and managing properties globally for 'blue chip' corporate companies. He then founded the Richland Group, based in Berkeley Square, London in 2001, which develops luxury residential and commercial property. He also co-founded the award-winning Kingly Club, a members only nightclub in Soho district. McCausland is currently CEO at the Richland Group.

In 2013, he bought the former home of the golfer Rory McIlroy in County Down.

Media career
In 2005, Channel Five approached McCausland to present How To Be A Property Developer. He has since fronted several property television shows for BBC1, and filmed House Wrecks To Riches for the Discovery Channel in June 2010. He is a member of the Sky News Money Panel and appears regularly on Newsnight, BBC Breakfast, C4 news, Sky News and FIVE news.

References

External links 
Gary McCausland Official Website
Channel Five's Property Developing Abroad— the show which he is host of.

1968 births
Living people
Businesspeople from Belfast
Television personalities from Belfast